This is a list of films produced in South Korea, from September 1948, the date of its creation, through 1959.

1956-1959

External links
 South Korean film at the Internet Movie Database
 1945-1959 at koreanfilm.org

1948
Films
South Korean
Films
South Korean